Aespa is a small borough in Kohila Parish, Rapla County in northwestern Estonia. The original single village of Aespa was divided into Aespa and Vana-Aespa in 2011.

Boroughs and small boroughs in Estonia